Volker Danner (born 21 August 1942; died 14 March 2005 in Wesel) was a German football player. He spent nine seasons in the Bundesliga with 1. FC Saarbrücken, Borussia Mönchengladbach, MSV Duisburg and Hamburger SV.

Honours
 Bundesliga champion: 1969–70
 DFB-Pokal finalist: 1973–74

References

External links
 

1942 births
2005 deaths
German footballers
1. FC Saarbrücken players
Borussia Mönchengladbach players
MSV Duisburg players
Hamburger SV players
Bundesliga players
Association football goalkeepers
People from Wesel
Sportspeople from Düsseldorf (region)
Footballers from North Rhine-Westphalia